Sitaula  is a village development committee in Darchula District in the Mahakali Zone of western Nepal.  At the time of the 2011 Nepal census it had a population of 3536 people living in 557 individual households.

References

External links
UN map of the municipalities of Darchula District

Populated places in Darchula District